Frederick Solly-Flood may refer to:
 Frederick Solly-Flood (British Army officer)
 Frederick Solly-Flood (attorney general), his father